Psalm 51, one of the penitential psalms, is the 51st psalm of the Book of Psalms, beginning in English in the King James Version: "Have mercy upon me, O God". In the slightly different numbering system used in the Greek Septuagint and Latin Vulgate translations of the Bible, this psalm is Psalm 50. In Latin, it is known as Miserere, in ), especially in musical settings. The introduction in the text says that it was composed by David as a confession to God after he sinned with Bathsheba.

The psalm forms a regular part of Jewish, Catholic, Eastern Orthodox and Protestant liturgies.

Background and themes
Psalm 51 is based on the incident recorded in 2 Samuel, chapters 11–12. David's confession is regarded as a model for repentance in both Judaism and Christianity.

The Midrash Tehillim states that one who acknowledges that he has sinned and is fearful and prays to God about it, as David did, will be forgiven. But one who tries to ignore his sin will be punished by God. The Talmud (Yoma 86b) cites verse 5 in the Hebrew (verse 3 in English versions), "My sin is always before me", as a reminder to the penitent to maintain continual vigilance in the area in which he transgressed, even after he has confessed and been absolved.

Charles Spurgeon says Psalm 51 is called "The Sinner's Guide", as it shows the sinner how to return to God's grace. Athanasius would recommend that this chapter be recited each night by some of his disciples. According to James Montgomery Boice, this psalm was recited by both Thomas More and Lady Jane Grey at their executions. 
    
Parallels between Psalm 51 and the Ancient Egyptian ritual text Opening of the mouth ceremony have been pointed out by scholar Benjamin Urrutia. These include:
Mentions of ritual washing with special herbs (verses 2, 7)
Restoration of broken bones (verse 8)
"O Lord, open my lips" (verse 15)
Sacrifices (verses 16, 17, 19)

Text
Following is the Hebrew text of Psalm 51:

King James Version
Have mercy upon me, O God, according to thy lovingkindness:
  according unto the multitude of thy tender mercies blot out my transgressions. 
Wash me thoroughly from mine iniquity,
  and cleanse me from my sin. 
For I acknowledge my transgressions:
  and my sin is ever before me. 
Against thee, thee only, have I sinned, and done this evil in thy sight:
 that thou mightest be justified when thou speakest, and be clear when thou judgest. 
Behold, I was shapen in iniquity;
  and in sin did my mother conceive me. 
Behold, thou desirest truth in the inward parts:
  and in the hidden part thou shalt make me to know wisdom. 
Purge me with hyssop, and I shall be clean: wash me, and I shall be whiter than snow. 
Make me to hear joy and gladness;
  that the bones which thou hast broken may rejoice. 
Hide thy face from my sins,
  and blot out all mine iniquities. 
Create in me a clean heart, O God;
  and renew a right spirit within me. 
Cast me not away from thy presence;
  and take not thy holy spirit from me. 
Restore unto me the joy of thy salvation;
  and uphold me with thy free spirit. 
Then will I teach transgressors thy ways;
  and sinners shall be converted unto thee. 
Deliver me from bloodguiltiness, O God, thou God of my salvation:
  and my tongue shall sing aloud of thy righteousness. 
O Lord, open thou my lips;
  and my mouth shall shew forth thy praise. 
For thou desirest not sacrifice;
  else would I give it: thou delightest not in burnt offering. 
The sacrifices of God are a broken spirit:
  a broken and a contrite heart, O God, thou wilt not despise. 
Do good in thy good pleasure unto Zion:
  build thou the walls of Jerusalem. 
Then shalt thou be pleased with the sacrifices of righteousness, with burnt offering and whole burnt offering:
  then shall they offer bullocks upon thine altar.

Verse 17
The sacrifices of God are a broken spirit;a broken and a contrite heart, O God, Thou wilt not despise.Verse 19 in the Hebrew (verse 17 in many modern English translations) suggests that God desires a "broken and contrite heart" more than he does sacrificial offerings. The idea of using brokenheartedness as a way to reconnect to God was emphasized in numerous teachings by Rebbe Nachman of Breslov. In Sichot HaRan #41 he taught: "It would be very good to be brokenhearted all day. But for the average person, this can easily degenerate into depression. You should therefore set aside some time each day for heartbreak. You should isolate yourself with a broken heart before God for a given time. But the rest of the day you should be joyful".

Uses
Judaism
Several verses from Psalm 51 are regular parts of Jewish liturgy. Verses (in Hebrew) 3, 4, 9, 13, 19, 20, and 21 are said in Selichot. Verses 9, 12, and 19 are said during Tefillat Zakkah prior to the Kol Nidrei service on Yom Kippur eve. Verse 17, "O Lord, open my lips", is recited as a preface to the Amidah in all prayer services. Verse 20 is said by Ashkenazi Jews before the removal of the Sefer Torah from the ark on Shabbat and Yom Tov morning; it is also said in the Atah Horaisa ("You have been shown") prayer recited before opening the ark on Simchat Torah. In the Sephardi liturgy, Psalm 51 is one of the additional psalms recited on Yom Kippur night.

Verse 4 is part of the Ushpizin ceremony on Sukkot.

In the Siddur Avodas Yisroel, Psalm 51 is the Song of the Day for Shabbat Parah and Shabbat Ki Tavo. This psalm is also said on Wednesday nights after the recital of Aleinu in Maariv.

The entire psalm is part of Tikkun Chatzot. It is also recited as a prayer for forgiveness.

New Testament
Verse 4 is quoted in Romans .

Eastern Orthodox
The most frequently used psalm in the Eastern Orthodox and Greek Catholic Churches, Psalm 50 (Septuagint numbering) it is called in the Greek language  Ἥ Ἐλεήμων He Eleḯmon, and begins in Greek  Ἐλέησόν με, ὁ Θεός Eléïsón me, o Theós.

In the Daily Office it is recited in each of three aggregates (evening, morning and noonday).

In the Divine Liturgy it is recited by the deacon while he censing the entire church at the conclusion of the Proskomedie, which is also known as killing Satan. It is also a part of many sacraments and other services, notably, as a penitential psalm, during the Mystery of Repentance.

In the Agpeya, Coptic Church's book of hours, it is recited at every office throughout the day as a prayer of confession and repentance.

Catholic Church
In Western Christianity, Psalm 51 (using the Masoretic numbering) is also used liturgically.

In the Catholic Church this psalm may be assigned by a priest to a penitent as a penance after Confession. Verse 7 of the psalm is traditionally sung as the priest sprinkles holy water over the congregation before Mass, in a rite known as the Asperges me, the first two words of the verse in Latin. This reference lends a striking significance to the Mass as Sacrifice, given that Hyssop was used for the smearing of blood on the lintels at the first Passover.

In the Divine Office, it was traditionally said at Lauds on all ferias; the 1911 reform restricted this use to the ferias of Advent, Septuagesima, and Lent, as well as the Sundays from Septuagesima Sunday to Palm Sunday inclusive. It is otherwise said as part of the weekly cycle on Wednesday at Matins. In the Liturgy of the Hours, it is prayed during Lauds (Morning Prayer) every Friday.

A section of verse 17 is often used as the invitatory antiphon the Liturgy of the Hours.

Parts of Psalm 51 are used as a responsorial psalm in both the Revised Common Lectionary and the Roman Catholic Lectionary on Ash Wednesday and on other days.

Book of Common Prayer
In the Church of England's Book of Common Prayer, this psalm is appointed to be read on the morning of the tenth day of the month.

 In English common law
The Miserere  was used for centuries as a judicial test of reading ability. This practice began as a means by which a defendant could claim to be a clergyman, and thus subject only to ecclesiastical courts and not subject to the power of civil courts. This was called pleading the benefit of clergy. The Biblical passage traditionally used for the literacy test was the first verse of Psalm 51. Thus, an illiterate person who had memorized this psalm could also claim the benefit of clergy, and Psalm 51 became known as the "neck-verse" because knowing it could save one's neck by transferring one's case from a secular court, where hanging was a likely sentence, to an ecclesiastical court, where both the methods of trial and the sentences given were more lenient, for example, a sentence of penance.

In medicine
It has been suggested that verse 7 "Purge me with hyssop, and I shall be clean:" is an early example of the medical use of Penicillium, the initial source of penicillin.

Possibly since the Middle Ages (and recorded in medical literature as early as the 16th century), the supplication and submission conveyed in the psalm has been linked by some common people with the pain and despair of a patient suffering from fecal vomiting, which received the vulgar name "Miserere mei" or "Miserere", inspired by verse 3 ("Miserere mei, Deus, secundum misericordiam tuam"). The condition is a common symptom of intestinal obstruction, which, without urgent surgical treatment, precedes the patient's death.

Musical settings
The Miserere was a frequently used text in Catholic liturgical music before the Second Vatican Council. Most of the settings, which are often used at Tenebrae, are in a simple falsobordone style. During the Renaissance many composers wrote settings. The earliest known polyphonic setting, probably dating from the 1480s, is by Johannes Martini, a composer working in the Este court in Ferrara. The extended polyphonic setting by Josquin des Prez, probably written in 1503/1504 in Ferrara, was likely inspired by the prison meditation Infelix ego by Girolamo Savonarola, who had been burned at the stake just five years before. Later in the 16th century Orlande de Lassus wrote an elaborate setting as part of his Penitential Psalms, and Palestrina, Andrea Gabrieli, Giovanni Gabrieli, and Carlo Gesualdo also wrote settings.

Heinrich Schütz set Psalm 53 in a metred version in German, "Erbarm dich mein, o Herre Gott", SWV 150, as part of the Becker Psalter, first published in 1628. Antonio Vivaldi may have written one or more settings, but such composition(s) have been lost, with only two introductory motets remaining.

One of the best-known settings of the Miserere is the 17th century version by Roman School composer Gregorio Allegri. According to a popular story, Wolfgang Amadeus Mozart, aged only fourteen, heard the piece performed once, on April 11, 1770, and after going back to his lodging for the night was able to write out the entire score from memory. He went back a day or two later with his draft to correct some errors. That the final chorus comprises a nine-part harmony, with a five-voice  choir and a four-voice choir singing simultaneously, underscores the prodigiousness of the young Mozart's musical genius. However, the only source of this story is a letter written by Leopold Mozart to his wife on April 14, 1770: and doubt has  been cast on it, owing to the fact that the Miserere was known in London, which Mozart had visited in 1764-65.

The piece is also noteworthy in having been transcribed erroneously by William Smith Rockstro as having numerous high Cs in the treble part. This interpolated version is nevertheless extremely popular and widely recorded.

Four settings were written by Marc-Antoine Charpentier (H.157, H.173, H.219, H.193-H.193 a). Louis-Nicolas Clérambault set one Miserere for soloists, chorus and continuo (organ) (date unknown). Sébastien de Brossard set one Miserere in 1688 - 89, André Campra set one Miserere in 1726 and many by Michel-Richard de Lalande (S15, S27, S87, S41/2, S32/17, S6/3), Costanzo Festa, Johann Sebastian Bach, Giovanni Battista Pergolesi and Saverio Selecchy. Jan Dismas Zelenka wrote two elaborate settings (ZWV 56 and ZWV 57).

Modern composers who have written notable settings of the Miserere include Michael Nyman, Arvo Pärt, and James MacMillan. References in secular popular music include the Antestor song "Mercy Lord", from the album Martyrium (1994), "In Manus Tuas" (Salvation 2003) by the group Funeral Mist, "White As Snow" (Winter 2008) by Jon Foreman, the song "Restore To Me" by Mac Powell and Candi Pearson-Shelton from Glory Revealed (2007). Bukas Palad Music Ministry includes their version of "Miserere" in their album Christify (2010). Modern Christian singer Keith Green put this psalm to music in the song "Create in Me a Clean Heart".

Verses 12–13 have been set to music as a popular Jewish inspirational song. Titled Lev Tahor ("A pure heart"), this song is commonly sung at Seudah Shlishit (the third Shabbat meal).

See also
 Benefit of clergy#The Miserere
 Kentish Psalm
 Penitential Psalms

References

Bibliography
 John Caldwell: "Miserere", Stanley Boorman, "Sources: MS", Stanley Sadie, "Mozart, Wolfgang Amadeus"; Grove Music Online, ed. L. Macy (Accessed November 25, 2006), 
 Patrick Macey, Bonfire Songs: Savonarola's Musical Legacy.'' Oxford, Clarendon Press. 1998.

External links

 
 
 Text of Psalm 51 according to the 1928 Psalter
 Psalms Chapter 51 text in Hebrew and English, mechon-mamre.org
 Tehillim — Psalms 51 (Judaica Press) translation with Rashi's commentary at Chabad.org
 For the leader. A psalm of David, when Nathan the prophet came to him after he had gone in to Bathsheba. / Have mercy on me, God, in accord with your merciful love text and footnotes, usccb.org United States Conference of Catholic Bishops
 Psalm 51:1 introduction and text, biblestudytools.com
 Psalm 51 – Restoration of a Broken and Contrite King enduringword.com
 Psalm 51 / Refrain: The sacrifice of God is a broken spirit. Church of England
 Psalm 51 at biblegateway.com
 Hymns for Psalm 51 hymnary.org
 Nova Vulgata version of Psalm 51(50)

051
Renaissance music
Works attributed to David